Kabojja is a neighborhood in Wakiso District, in the Central Region of Uganda.

Location
The neighborhood is bordered by the Lubigi Wetland and Busegato the north, Nateete to the northeast and east, Kinaawa to the south. The Entebbe-Kampala Expressway and Kyengera lie to the west of Kabojja. The coordinates of the neighborhood are: 0°17'27.0"N, 32°30'55.0"E (Latitude:0.290840; Longitude:32.515270).

Points of interest
The following points of interest are within the town limits or close to the edges of town:

 Islamic University in Uganda maintains a campus at Kabojja, that caters exclusively to female students.
 The Entebbe-Kampala Expressway separates Kabojja o the east, from Kyengera to the west.
 Mugwanya Preparatory School
 Kabojja Preparatory Primary School

See also
List of cities and towns in Uganda

References

External links

Wakiso District
Populated places in Central Region, Uganda